Yu Lijun (born August 1967) is a Chinese university administrator and politician who is the current head of the Organization Department of the CCP Sichuan Provincial Committee, in office since February 2021.

He was a representative of the 19th National Congress of the Chinese Communist Party and is a representative of the 20th National Congress of the Chinese Communist Party. He is an alternate member of the 20th Central Committee of the Chinese Communist Party.

Biography
Yu was born in Jianping County, Liaoning, in August 1967.

After graduating from Tianjin University in 1989, he worked at the university, where he eventually becoming vice president in 2007. In 2008, he became director of Tianjin Municipal Education Commission, a post he kept until 2011, when he was appointed party secretary of Tianjin University of Technology and Education. In 2013, he was made executive deputy secretary of the Education Working Committee of the CCP Tianjin Municipal Committee, rising to secretary in October 2019.

He was appointed head of the Organization Department of the CCP Sichuan Provincial Committee and president of the Party School in February 2021 and was admitted to member of the Standing Committee of the CCP Sichuan Provincial Committee, the province's top authority.

References

1967 births
Living people
People from Jianping County
Tianjin University alumni
Academic staff of Tianjin University
People's Republic of China politicians from Liaoning
Chinese Communist Party politicians from Liaoning
Alternate members of the 20th Central Committee of the Chinese Communist Party